The  is a Spanish breed of scenthound. It originates in the provinces of Álava and Bizkaia in the Basque Autonomous Community in northern Spain. It is one of five Basque breeds of dog, the others being the Basque Shepherd Dog, the Pachón de Vitoria, the Villano de Las Encartaciones and the Villanuco de Las Encartaciones, and is one of fourteen animal breeds native to the Basque Country. It was traditionally used for hunting hare, but since the hare became scarce in the Basque country it is more frequently used to hunt wild boar, roe deer or occasionally foxes.

It is critically endangered: in 2009 there were fewer than fifty examples.

History 

The Erbi Txakur originates in the provinces of Álava and Bizkaia in the Basque Autonomous Community in northern Spain, and is the traditional hare-hunting dog of Basque hunters; the name of the breed means 'hare dog'. It is one of five Basque breeds of dog, the others being the Basque Shepherd Dog, the Pachón de Vitoria, the Villano de Las Encartaciones and the Villanuco de Las Encartaciones. Of these, all but the Pachón de Vitoria are indigenous to the Basque Autonomous Community, and were recognised as traditional Basque breeds by government decree in 2001. It was among the fourteen indigenous animal breeds included in the rural development plan for the País Vasco for 2007–2013.

With the Villanuco de Las Encartaciones it is one of the most seriously endangered breeds of the Basque Country: in 2009 there were fewer than fifty examples.

Use 

The Erbi Txakur was traditionally used for hunting hare, but since the hare became scarce in the Basque country it is mainly used to hunt wild boar; it may also be used in hunting roe deer or occasionally foxes.

References 

Dog breeds originating in the Basque Country (autonomous community)
Dog breeds originating in Cantabria
Rare dog breeds
Dog breeds originating in Spain
Basque domestic animal breeds